The Old Fitzroy Theatre (also called the Old Fitz Theatre) is a pub theatre in Woolloomooloo in central Sydney, Australia.

The 58-seat venue was established by Jeremy Cumpston in 1997 in the cellar of the Old Fitzroy Hotel. It is known for independent productions featuring emerging artists. Many leading Australian theatre makers participated in plays at the theatre early in their careers. The theatre was managed until 2012 by Tamarama Rock Surfers, and since 2014 by Red Line Productions.

After having to close for one year, they presented twelve productions in their 2021/2022 season, including Ionescu's Exit the King, Beckett's Happy Days, Sarah Kane's Cleansed, the Broadway play Hand to God, and Mahagonny-Songspiel and The Seven Deadly Sins by Brecht and Weill. To raise funds for the continued operation of the venue, Guy Noble (piano) and Teddy Tahu Rhodes (bass-baritone) gave a series of six concerts in November/December 2022.

References

External links
 Red Line Productions – Old Fitz Theatre

Theatres in Sydney
Theatre companies in Australia
Performing groups established in 1997
1997 establishments in Australia
Studio theatres
1997 in theatre